Algibacter lectus is a Gram-negative, facultatively anaerobic, heterotrophic and motile bacterium from the genus of Algibacter which has been isolated from the algae Acrosiphonia sonderi and Ulva fenestrata.

References

Flavobacteria
Bacteria described in 2004